Jacek Lachowicz (born 15 November 1972 in Gostynin) is a Polish musician, author and producer. He began his musical career playing synthesizer in the alternative rock group Ścianka from 1996 to 2005. He played synthesizer in 2000 in the group Lenny Valentino (along with other members of Ścianka) before the group split in 2001.
Currently, he has a solo career as a singer-songwriter under the name "Lachowicz". His songs are associated with alternative music and he made the top of the major Polish music channels with Płyń. In early 2008, Lachowicz and Ania Dabrowska joined together to perform Płyń, which then became for many weeks the most-heard song on Polish radio stations.

Solo discography
 Split EP (2004)
 Jacek Lachowicz (album) (2004)
 Za morzami (2007)
 Runo (Mystic, 2008)
 Pigs, Joys and Organs (Mystic, 2009)

References

External links
 Lachowicz official web
 Ścianka web
 Lachowicz MySpace

1972 births
Living people
Polish singer-songwriters
Polish male writers
Polish rock singers
21st-century Polish male singers
21st-century Polish singers